Iddi Leif Deleuran Alkhag (born 17 August 1978) is a Danish former footballer of Tanzanian descent. He has previously played for Esbjerg fB, Silkeborg IF, FC Fredericia, and BK Frem in Denmark, as well as Icelandic club HK. He has played 14 games and scored one goal for the Denmark national under-21 football team.

References

External links
Danish national team profile
Danish Superliga statistics
BK Frem profile

1978 births
Living people
People from Esbjerg
Danish men's footballers
Danish Superliga players
Danish 1st Division players
Denmark under-21 international footballers
Denmark youth international footballers
Esbjerg fB players
Silkeborg IF players
FC Fredericia players
Hobro IK players
Boldklubben Frem players
Danish expatriates in Iceland
Danish people of Tanzanian descent
Expatriate footballers in Iceland
Handknattleiksfélag Kópavogs players
Association football forwards
FC Djursland players
Sportspeople from the Region of Southern Denmark